Abdul-Wali al-Shameri is a Yemeni diplomat, poet and writer. He quit his position as Ambassador to Egypt over the 2011 Yemeni uprising.

Biography 
He was born on 4 August 1956 in Shamir province, Taiz Governorate. He is a Yemeni poet and writer. He resigned from his position as the Ambassador of Yemen to the Arab Republic of Egypt on 19 March 2011. Chairman of the Forum of Arab intellectuals Cairo and Chairman of the Foundation for creativity and culture Sanaa.

References

Yemeni diplomats
Ambassadors of Yemen to Egypt
Living people
Governors of Marib
People from Taiz Governorate
1956 births